Villa Paz S.A. is an urban fragment adjoined to the city of La Paz in the Canelones Department, southern Uruguay.

Geography

Location
It is located west at the west part of the city and north of the city centre. It is separated by a quarry to its east from the rest of the urban area and joined with it to the north and to the south by Manuel Tiscornia street.

Population 
According to the 2011 census, Villa Paz S.A. has a population of 542.
 
Source: Instituto Nacional de Estadística de Uruguay

References

External links 
INE map of La Paz, Barrio Cópola, Costa y Guillamón, Villa Paz S.A. and Barrio La Lucha

Populated places in the Canelones Department